The Mouse on the Moon is a 1963 British comedy film, the sequel to The Mouse That Roared. It is an adaptation of the 1962 novel The Mouse on the Moon by Irish author Leonard Wibberley, and was directed by Richard Lester. In it, the people of the Duchy of Grand Fenwick, a microstate in Europe, attempt space flight using wine as a propellant. It satirises the space race, Cold War and politics.

Peter Sellers, who had played three roles in the first film, did not return for this sequel and was replaced by Margaret Rutherford and Ron Moody for two of Sellers' characters. The third character, Tully Bascombe, was not present in the sequel. Likewise Leo McKern did not reprise his role of Benter; this part was played by Roddy McMillan. The film also featured June Ritchie, Bernard Cribbins and Terry-Thomas, with David Kossoff reprising his role as Professor Kokintz.

Plot
Financial disaster looms for Grand Fenwick when the current vintage of its only export, wine, starts exploding in would-be consumers' faces. Prime Minister Mountjoy (Ron Moody) decides to ask the United States for a loan, ostensibly to fund its entry in the race to the Moon, but actually to save the duchy (and install modern plumbing so he can have a hot bath). The devious politician knows that the Americans will not believe him, but will consider the half million dollars he is asking for to be cheap propaganda supporting their hollow call for international co-operation in space. He is delighted when they send him double the amount as an outright gift. The Soviets, not wishing to be one-upped by their Cold War rivals, deliver an obsolete rocket. Mountjoy asks resident scientist Professor Kokintz (David Kossoff) to arrange a small explosion during the "launch" of their lunar rocket to make it look like they have actually spent the money as intended.

Meanwhile, Mountjoy's son Vincent (Bernard Cribbins) returns after being educated in England. Mountjoy is disappointed to find that Vincent has picked up the British sense of fair play and the ambition to be an astronaut. Professor Kokintz has pleasant news for Vincent: he has discovered that the wine makes excellent rocket fuel. Together, they secretly begin preparing the rocket for flight. Maurice Spender (Terry-Thomas), a bumbling spy sent by the suspicious British, is given a tour of the ship, including the shower heads converted into attitude jets, and reports back to his bosses that it is all a hoax.

Mountjoy invites the Americans, Soviets, and British to the launching. To everyone's surprise, the rocket leisurely takes off with Kokintz and Vincent aboard. Kokintz calculates it will take three weeks to reach the Moon. Humiliated, the Americans and Soviets decide to risk sending their own crewed rockets, timing it so they will land at the same time as (or a little before) Grand Fenwick's ship. However, Vincent accidentally hits a switch, speeding up the vessel, and he and Kokintz become the first to set foot on the Moon. The latecomers are greatly disappointed. When the Americans and Soviets try to race home to salvage some sort of propaganda coup, they almost enter the wrong ships and then, when they attempt lift-off, both descend deep into the lunar dust. The American and Soviet spacemen have to hitch a ride with Kokintz and Vincent.

They return to Grand Fenwick during a memorial ceremony (they had been out of radio contact for weeks and presumed lost). The diplomats immediately begin squabbling about who reached the Moon first.

Cast

Margaret Rutherford as Grand Duchess Gloriana XIII
Ron Moody as Prime Minister Rupert Mountjoy
Bernard Cribbins as Vincent Mountjoy
Ed Bishop as American Astronaut 
David Kossoff as Professor Kokintz
Terry-Thomas as Maurice Spender
June Ritchie as Cynthia, Mountjoy's protester niece and Vincent's love interest
John Le Mesurier as British delegate
John Phillips as Bracewell, the American delegate
Eric Barker as MI5 man
Roddy McMillan as Benter
Tom Aldredge as Wendover
Michael Trubshawe as British aide
Peter Sallis as Russian delegate
Clive Dunn as Bandleader
Hugh Lloyd as Plumber
Graham Stark as Standard bearer 
Mario Fabrizi as Mario, the valet
Jan Conrad as Russian aide 
John Bluthal as Max Von Neidel 
Archie Duncan as U.S. Air Force general 
Guy Deghy as Russian scientist 
Richard Marner as Russian Air Force general 
Allan Cuthbertson as Member of Whitehall Conference 
Robin Bailey as Member of Whitehall Conference
John Wood as countryman
Frankie Howerd as himself

Production
The film was made on sets left over from Cornel Wilde's film Sword of Lancelot.  Sellers recommended Lester, whom he knew from his direction of The Running, Jumping and Standing Still Film. Producer Walter Shenson and director Lester next made The Beatles film A Hard Day's Night. 

Dell Publishing issued a comic book of the film.

References

External links

1963 films
1960s science fiction comedy films
British political satire films
British satirical films
British science fiction comedy films
British sequel films
Cold War films
Films about space programs
Films adapted into comics
Films based on Irish novels
Films directed by Richard Lester
Films set in Europe
Films shot at Pinewood Studios
Moon in film
United Artists films
Films scored by Ron Grainer
1963 comedy films
1960s English-language films
1960s British films